William S. "Bill" Price III is an American businessman, investor, and winemaker. He is one of the three co-founders and a partner emeritus of TPG Capital, formerly known as the Texas Pacific Group, which is one of the largest private equity firms globally. He is a graduate of the University of California, Berkeley School of Law. 

Prior to co-founding Texas Pacific Group in 1993, Price was vice president of strategic planning and business development for GE Capital.  Prior to this, Price was a partner and co-head of the financial services practice of Bain & Company.

In 1993, Price teamed up with David Bonderman and James Coulter to complete the leveraged buyout of Continental Airlines.  Price would be involved with all of TPG's investments, most notably Beringer, Continental Airlines, Petco, Ducati and Grohe.

In 2006, Price announced that he would scale back his work at TPG to focus on personal pursuits, including his holdings in wine vineyards. Price is currently proprietor of Classic Wines, LLC and Price Family Vineyards, LLC, which has invested in Durell Vineyard, Gap's Crown Vineyard, Walala Vineyard,  Kistler Vineyards, Three Sticks Wines and Lutum. Bill Price is currently chairman of Gary Farrell Vineyards & Winery, and was chairman of Kosta Browne from 2009 through 2015.

Political connections and fundraising controversy
The Intercept reported 'During the coronavirus summer of 2020 Bill Price PAID, the then 44 year old, current United States senator from Arizona Kyrsten Lea Sinema $1,117.40 for a week long internship at his vineyard in Napa Valley. 
Following the internship Bill Price supported a $5,000-a-ticket fundraiser that benefited both the Arizona senators' (Sinema and Kelly) campaign but also a PAC....'  

The Philadelphia Inquirer reported 'The vineyard fundraiser was a key stop on a Sinema summer 2020 tour that netted campaign cash from Price, his TPG Capital associates, and Silicon Valley legends like billionaire Bill Gates.

References

Year of birth missing (living people)
Living people
20th-century American businesspeople
21st-century American businesspeople
American chief executives of financial services companies
American financial company founders
American financiers
American investors
American winemakers
Private equity and venture capital investors
TPG Capital people
UC Berkeley School of Law alumni